Svastra obliqua, the sunflower bee, is a species of long-horned bee in the family Apidae. It is found in Central America and North America.

Subspecies
These three subspecies belong to the species Svastra obliqua:
 Svastra obliqua caliginosa (Cresson, 1878)
 Svastra obliqua expurgata (Cockerell, 1925)
 Svastra obliqua obliqua (Say, 1837)

References

Further reading

External links

 

Apinae
Articles created by Qbugbot
Insects described in 1837